NGC 4245 is a barred lenticular galaxy with a ring located in the constellation Coma Berenices. It was discovered on March 13, 1785 by the astronomer William Herschel. It is a member of the Coma I Group.

References

External links 
 

Coma Berenices
4245
Barred lenticular galaxies
Ring galaxies
Coma I Group
07328
39437